Tomás Iwasaki Espinoza (13 November 1937 – 23 April 2020) was a Peruvian footballer. He competed in the men's tournament at the 1960 Summer Olympics. He won the Peruvian league title four times with Universitario.

References

External links
 

1937 births
2020 deaths
Peruvian footballers
Peru international footballers
Olympic footballers of Peru
Footballers at the 1960 Summer Olympics
Footballers from Lima
Association football forwards
Club Universitario de Deportes footballers
Deportivo Municipal footballers
Peruvian people of Japanese descent